Tarará is a gated resort town in Havana, Cuba.

Tarara may refer to:

Nichifor Tarara, Romanian sprint canoer and 1958 Olympic bronze medalist
Stefan Tarara, third place violinist in the 2010 Paganini Competition and 2011 Henryk Wieniawski Violin Competition
Tarara, a character in Utopia, Limited, a Gilbert and Sullivan opera
Tarara, a name given to the members of the Croatian diaspora in New Zealand by Māori
Tarara, New Zealand, a locality in South Otago